These road signs are used in Vietnam following Chinese and French practice. Some signs are written in both Vietnamese and English. The signs are prescribed by the Ministry of Transportation of Vietnam.

Prohibition signs

Warning signs

Mandatory signs

RE signs

Indication signs

Additional panels

Historical

References

Vietnam
Road transport in Vietnam